The 1958 VFL Night Premiership Cup was the Victorian Football League end of season cup competition played in August and September of the 1958 VFL Premiership Season. This was the third year the VFL Night Series had existed. In last years competition, each of the day finalists were duly defeated upon entry and their addition to the competition resulted in a drawn-out and complicated fixture of matches. The VFL thus elected to return to the original format for this year's competition as previously used in the 1956 Night Series Cup. Run as a knock-out tournament, it was contested by the eight VFL teams that failed to make the 1958 VFL finals series. Games were played at the Lake Oval, Albert Park, then the home ground of South Melbourne, as it was the only ground equipped to host night games. St Kilda went on to win the night series cup, defeating Carlton in the final by 8 points.

Games

Round 1

|- bgcolor="#CCCCFF"
| Winning team
| Winning team score
| Losing team
| Losing team score
| Ground
| Crowd
| Date
|- bgcolor="#FFFFFF"
| 
| 16.16 (112)
| 
| 11.19 (85)
| Lake Oval
| 6,800
| Thursday, 28 August
|- bgcolor="#FFFFFF"
| 
| 8.21 (69)
| 
| 9.12 (66)
| Lake Oval
| 11,000
| Tuesday, 2 September
|- bgcolor="#FFFFFF"
| 
| 17.10 (112)
| 
| 12.13 (85)
| Lake Oval
| 14,000
| Thursday, 4 September
|- bgcolor="#FFFFFF"
| 
| 9.19 (73)
| 
| 4.20 (44)
| Lake Oval
| 17,850
| Tuesday, 9 September

Semifinals

|- bgcolor="#CCCCFF"
| Winning team
| Winning team score
| Losing team
| Losing team score
| Ground
| Crowd
| Date
|- bgcolor="#FFFFFF"
| 
| 10.12 (72)
| 
| 6.16 (52)
| Lake Oval
| 16,200
| Thursday, 11 September
|- bgcolor="#FFFFFF"
| 
| 13.13 (91)
| 
| 6.10 (46)
| Lake Oval
| 15,500
| Tuesday, 16 September

Final

|- bgcolor="#CCCCFF"
| Winning team
| Winning team score
| Losing team
| Losing team score
| Ground
| Crowd
| Date
|- bgcolor="#FFFFFF"
| 
| 16.13 (109)
| 
| 15.11 (101)
| Lake Oval
| 26,400
| Monday, 22 September

See also

List of Australian Football League night premiers
1958 VFL season

External links
 1958 VFL Night Premiership - detailed review including quarter-by-quarter scores, best players and goalkickers for each match

Australian Football League pre-season competition